Shahaji Bhonsle ruled the Indian princely state of Satara from 1839 until his death in 1848. He was also known as Appa Saheb, and his full titles were Shreemant Maharaj Shahaji Bhonsle Raja Chhatrapati of Satara.

His elder brother Raja Pratap Singh, Raja of Satara was dethroned and stripped of his powers and personal possessions by the British East India Company in 1839. Appa Sahib succeeded his brother under the title Shreemant Maharaj Shajee Raja Chhatrapati of Satara.

After his death, the British questioned the irregularity of his adoption, refused to recognise the succession, and annexed the state of Satara to the Presidency of Bombay under the doctrine of lapse, on 1 May 1849.

See also
The rest of the list of titular kings of Satara can be found by clicking here: Chhhatrapatis of Satara

References

1802 births
1848 deaths
Maharajas of Satara